Tegenaria taurica is a spider species found in Ukraine and Georgia.

See also 
 List of Agelenidae species

References

External links 

taurica
Spiders of Georgia (country)
Spiders of Europe
Spiders described in 1947